Reena may refer to:

Reena (given name), including a list of people with the name
Reena (actress), Indian film actress in Malayalam films
Murder of Reena Virk
Camps Mohican Reena, sleepaway camps in Massachusetts